Tartar was launched in France in 1807, almost surely under another name. She was captured circa 1811 and traded to Brazil, first from Liverpool and then from Falmouth, Cornwall. She disappeared without a trace in January 1814.

Career
Tartar first appeared in Lloyd's Register (LR), in 1811.

Fate
On 4 February 1814 Tartar, West, master, was reported to have arrived at St Michaels from Spain. Around 2 January 1814 she sailed from St Michaels for London and was never heard from again.

Citations

1807 ships
Ships built in France
Captured ships
Age of Sail merchant ships of England
Maritime incidents in 1814
Missing ships
Ships lost with all hands